Bombardment of Tourane or Bombardment of Đà Nẵng may refer to:

Bombardment of Tourane (1847)
Bombardment of Tourane (1856)
Siege of Tourane (1858–1860)